Sanur may refer to:

 Sanur, Jenin, a Palestinian town in the northern West Bank
 Sanur, Iran, a village in Mazandaran Province, Iran
 Sa-Nur, a former Israeli settlement
 Sanur, Bali, a beach side village on the South-East side of the Indonesian island of Bali